The Golden Communion is the sixth album by Thighpaulsandra, released on 4 September  2015. It marks Thighpaulsandra's return to solo work after nearly a decade of touring with Spiritualized, Elizabeth Fraser and Wire. The album pulls from over ten years of recording sessions; as such, The Golden Communion boasts collaborations not only with Thighpaulsandra regulars Martin Schellard and Siôn Orgon, but also with John Balance and Peter Christopherson, the late founders of industrial band Coil. Overall, the music presented contains threads of psychedelic and progressive rock, featuring orchestrations and extended pop music song structures not heard before on a Thighpaulsandra album.

The Golden Communion was released physically in 2CD and 3LP formats, as well as digitally in 24-bit FLAC.

Track listing

Personnel
Thighpaulsandra – vocals, piano, harpsichord, synthesizers, electric piano, organ; percussion on "A Devil in Every Hedgerow" and "The More I Know Men…"; bass, cittern and autoharp on "Valerie"
Martin Schellard – guitars; bass on "Salute", "The Golden Communion", "Misery" and "The Sinking Stone"; cittern on "The Foot Garden"; electronics on "A Devil in Every Hedgerow"; slide guitar on "Valerie"
Siôn Orgon – drums; vocals on "Did He Fall?", "The Foot Garden, "The Golden Communion", "Misery", "The Sinking Stone", "On the Register"; AudioMulch on "Did He Fall?" and "The More I Know Men…"; photography
John Balance – vocals and effects on "Did He Fall?" and "The More I Know Men…"; singing bowls and ARP 2600 on "The More I Know Men…"
Peter Christopherson – "rhythmic interference" on "Did He Fall?"
Dirk Campbell – duduk on "The Foot Garden"
Liam Thomas – Steim Cracklebox on "The Foot Garden"
The Maureen Wilson Quartet – strings on "The Golden Communion"
Helen Bishop – clarinet on "Misery"
Steve Cole – bass on "On the Register"
Dan Greensmith – vocals on "Valerie"
Rob Greensmith – vocals on "Valerie"; engineering
Joanna Swan – vocals on "Did He Fall?", "The Foot Garden", "Misery" and "Valerie"
Lara Ward – vocals on "Did He Fall?"; choreography
Nick Pullin – vocals on "Did He Fall?", "Misery" and "Valerie"
George McCarthy – vocals on "A Devil in Every Hedgerow"
Pan, Moon and Fox (dogs) – "dog stuff" on "The More I Know Men…"
Rashad Becker – mastering

References
Press release from Editions MEGO
discogs.com entry

Thighpaulsandra albums
2015 albums